Yarim is a sub-district located in Yarim District, Ibb Governorate, Yemen. Yarim had a population of 46498 as of  2004.

References 

Sub-districts in Yarim District